The Ukrainian State, sometimes also called the Second Hetmanate, was an anti-Bolshevik government that existed on most of the modern territory of Ukraine (except for Western Ukraine) from 29 April to 14 December 1918.

It was installed by German military authorities after the socialist-leaning Central Council of the Ukrainian People's Republic was dispersed on 28 April 1918. Ukraine turned into a provisional dictatorship of Hetman of Ukraine Pavlo Skoropadskyi, who outlawed all socialist-oriented political parties, creating an anti-Bolshevik front with the Russian State. It collapsed in December 1918, when Skoropadskyi was deposed and the Ukrainian People's Republic returned to power in the form of the Directorate.

Geography 
The country lay in Eastern Europe along the middle and lower sections of the Dnieper on the coast of the Black Sea and the Sea of Azov. The Ukrainian State covered most of the territory of modern-day Ukraine—minus West Ukraine, Budjak and Crimea. Its territory however extended into today's Russia, Belarus, Moldova and Poland.

To its northeast Ukraine established a preliminary demarcation line with the Russian SFSR, on the east it had a border with the Don Republic, to its south were the Black and Azov Seas, while the Crimean peninsula—the Crimean Regional Government—came under the control of Sulkevych. To the southwest along the Dniester lay a border with the Kingdom of Romania, to the west Ukraine bordered the German Empire and Austria-Hungary. To the north were the German-occupied territories of Ober Ost and the Belarusian People's Republic.

History 

As a result of the Bolshevik aggression, the government of the Ukrainian People's Republic that initially pursued anti-military policy sought military support after the capital Kyiv was sacked on 9 February 1918, by Mikhail Muravyov. On 9 February, Ukraine signed the Treaty of Brest-Litovsk with the coalition of the Central Powers and by March all Bolshevik forces of the Russian SFSR were removed from the territory of Ukraine. The German Army Group Kyiv was created in order to protect Ukraine from further Bolshevik aggression and headed by the German field marshal Hermann von Eichhorn.

On 25 April, the administration of Army Group Kyiv suspected the government of Vsevolod Holubovych of kidnapping of Abram Dobry (1867–1936), the chairman of the Foreign Trade Bank in Kyiv. Through that bank the German occupational forces were officially conducting all financial operations with the Reichsbank in Berlin. The next day, Eichhorn issued a decree according to which all criminal cases on the territory of Ukraine could selectively fall under the jurisdiction of the German field military court instead of the Ukrainian court system. At the next session of the Central Council on 29 April, Holubovych stated:

On the same day (29 April), a party congress of bread producers consisting of some 6,000 delegates from all eight governorates of Ukraine was taking place in the building of the Kyiv Circus. After receiving information about the situation at the Congress from his couriers, Pavlo Skoropadskyi later arrived in his car to the event where he was elected the Hetman of Ukraine. After that all participants moved to St. Sophia's Square, where Skoropadskyi was blessed by Nykodym, the Vicar of Kyiv and Galicia (Metropolitan Vladimir was executed by Bolsheviks). That night the Hetman supporters took over government building of military and internal affairs as well as the State Bank. The following day, the elite and most loyal formation of the Central Council, the Sich Riflemen, was disarmed.

Skoropadskyi issued his manifesto (hramota) "To the All-Ukrainian Nation" and the Law of the Provisional State System. Desiring stability, the Austro-Hungarian and German forces welcomed the coup; Skoropadskyi co-operated with them, making him unpopular among many Ukrainian peasants. The new state retained the tryzub (coat of arms) and the national flag but reversed the design to light blue over yellow. The Sich Riflemen opposed the coup and were disbanded along with the "Bluecoats", a Ukrainian division formed from POWs in Germany and Austria-Hungary named after their blue uniforms.

Internal opposition was provoked by the requisitioning of food stocks and restoration of land to the wealthy landowners. Opponents of the Skoropadskyi regime committed acts of arson and sabotage and, in July 1918, assassinated Hermann von Eichhorn, the commander of German troops in Ukraine. In August 1918, the anti-Skoropadskyi coalition succeeded in forcing him to re-form the Sich Riflemen. By then it was becoming obvious that the Central Powers had lost the war and that Skoropadskyi could no longer rely on their support. He thus looked for support from conservative Russian elements in society and proposed joining a federation with Anton Denikin and the White movement. This further eroded his standing among Ukrainians.

In December 1918, Skoropadskyi was deposed and the Directorate was established as a form of the Ukrainian People's Republic.

Administrative divisions

Ukrainian Civil War 

Almost the entire commanding staff of the Ukrainian State armed forces consisted of officers of the former Imperial Russian Army. Most officers were not supportive of the Ukrainian cause and viewed it as a way to make it through tough times. At the same time, wide masses of the population did not have a developed sense of national identity and easily fell under the influence of socialist and communist propaganda.

Following the armistice ending World War I, Ukrainian socialists formed the Directorate of Ukraine (the "Directory"), whose forces were spearheaded by the Sich Riflemen and "Greycoats". Although German and Austrian troops had not yet withdrawn from Ukraine, they had no further interest in fighting. Most of Skoropadskyi's own forces changed sides and joined the Directory.

On 16 November 1918, starting in Bila Tserkva, fighting broke out in the Hetmanate. Skoropadskyi had to turn to the thousands of Russian White Guard officers who had escaped to Ukraine with the intention of joining Denikin's Volunteer Army in the region of the Don river further east. They were assembled into a "Special Corps" but proved unable to resist the Directory's forces led by Symon Petliura. Skoropadskyi abdicated his position as Hetman on 14 December, as the Ukrainian People's Army took Kyiv. He was expelled and the Hetmanate was replaced by the provisional government of the Directorate.

Religion 

According to the "Laws on the Provisional State System of Ukraine", the leading position of the country was occupied by the Christian Orthodox faith. At the same time, citizens of Ukraine who belonged to other denominations had the right to profess their religion and rites.

The Russian Orthodox Church, and later the Ukrainian Autocephalous Orthodox Church, ruled in Central and Eastern Ukraine. However, in Western Ukraine there was friction between Orthodox, Greek Catholics, Roman Catholics and Jews. In the conflicts, the Ministry of Confessions of the Ukrainian State and the Council of Ministers morally and materially supported the Orthodox clergy.

On 25 June, the government allocated 3 million rubles to help priests who moved to Volhynia, Kholmshchyna, Grodno, Podolia, and Polesia, which were annexed to the Ukrainian State. On 2 July, 120,000 roubles were allocated for the maintenance of the Orthodox clergy in the lands of Kholmshchyna, Podlachia and Polesia.

References

Further reading

External links 

 The Ukrainian National Republic and the Struggle for Independence, 1917–1920 at the Internet Encyclopedia of Ukraine 

 
1918 disestablishments in Ukraine
1918 establishments in Ukraine
1918 in Ukraine
Former client states
Former countries
Former countries in Europe
Former monarchies
History of Ukraine (1918–1991)
Post–Russian Empire states
States and territories disestablished in 1918
States and territories established in 1918
Ukrainian independence movement
Ukrainian monarchy
Ukrainian People's Republic
Provisional governments